Statsraad Lehmkuhl is a three-masted barque rigged sail training vessel owned and operated by the Statsraad Lehmkuhl Foundation. It is based in Bergen, Norway and contracted out for various purposes, including serving as a school ship for the Royal Norwegian Navy (using RNoN's prefix "HNoMS").

It was built in 1914 by Joh. C. Tecklenborg ship yard in Geestemünde as a school training ship for the German merchant marine under the name Grossherzog Friedrich August. After the First World War the ship was taken as a prize by the United Kingdom and in 1921 the ship was bought by former Norwegian cabinet minister Kristofer Lehmkuhl (hence the name, which means "Cabinet Minister Lehmkuhl"). Except during the Second World War, when she was captured and under the name of Westwärts used by German forces, the ship belonged to Bergens Skoleskib from 1921 until donated to the Foundation in 1978.

In 2000, she was chartered by the German Navy while their Gorch Fock was overhauled.

In 2019 the ship was upgraded from diesel to hybrid power by Kongsberg (Rolls-Royce Commercial Marine), whereby a 370 kWh battery bank is charged while the ship is being powered by the wind, and can be used to drive the ship's propellers when the sails no longer provide sufficient power, reducing the need to rely on the ship's diesel engine. The batteries are also used to provide energy for the ship's instruments, lights and galley.

In 2021, the ship featured in an NRK slow TV feature from 6 July to 15 August, sailing from Nordkapp to Arendal calling at ports along the Norwegian coastline. In August 2021 Statsraad Lehmkuhl started the "One Ocean Expedition", circumnavigating the world equipped as a scientific research vessel, collecting meteorological and hydrographical data along with samples of fish, microplastics, zooplankton, eDNA, and carbon dioxide in the water. The ship was hired by marine research institutions on some of the legs.   

In spring of 2022 the Ocean Frontier Institute sponsored undergraduate students from Dalhousie University in Halifax and Memorial University of Newfoundland on a 16-week expedition aboard the ship. The students participated as crew members following an ocean sustainability course offered through Norway's University of Bergen.   

The ship has participated numerous times in the Tall Ship Races persistently finishing high in standing in her class.

Sister ships
The three sister ships of Statsraad Lehmkuhl also survive:
 Dar Pomorza (originally Prinzess Eitel Friedrich)
 Duchesse Anne (originally Großherzogin Elisabeth)
 Schulschiff Deutschland

See also
 List of large sailing vessels
 List of tall ships

References

External links
 The Statsraad Lehmkuhl Foundation
 The Royal Norwegian Navy's homepage of the Statsraad Lehmkuhl. (in Norwegian).
 Photo Noca 2006 Nordic Cadet Meeting / Statsraad Lehmkuhl in Oulu Finland 3.-6.8.2006 
 An alumni Music Video from Statsraad Lehmkuhl American 'Oceanics School' voyages in 1970-71 and 1972-73
 Statsraad Lehmkuhl winning the Tall Ships Races 2016, Antwerp-Lisbon
 One Ocean Expedition, the Mauritius - Mozambique leg

Barques
History of Bergen
Individual sailing vessels
Training ships of the Royal Norwegian Navy
Ships built in Bremen (state)
Tall ships of Germany
Tall ships of Norway
1914 ships
Naval ships of Norway captured by Germany during World War II